Solène Debiès (born 20 July 1975) is a French graphic artist and illustrator.

Biography 
Solène Debiès was graduated from the Pivaut school of Applied Arts and Narrative Drawing in Nantes in 1996.

After starting her professional life as a graphic designer in an advertising agency, she started illustrating in 2000, and began to work for the press, in publishing and advertising. She tends to draw characters in a graphic and colorful style.

She drew for newspapers such as Elle (India) (from 2005 to 2013), Harper's Bazaar (India), S Magazine (UK), Biba (France), Marie-Claire (France), Le Figaro (France), or Nail Pro (US).

She illustrated the book of the humorist Olivier Giraud  "The (very) practical guide to the perfect Parisian" and the women from Cannes for the "sales & the city" campaigns shown in the town hall of Cannes.

In 2019, she is quoted as being one of 5 French illustrators to follow on Instagram by the magazine Bewaremag.

Illustrations

Press 
Elle (India), Harper's Bazaar (India), Biba, Le Figaro, Marie-Claire, Version Femina, Nail Pro (USA), Parenting (USA), S Magazine (UK), Magnifique by Cristina sur TEVA, Jeune et Jolie, Marie-France, Gala.

Books 

 Comme des soeurs, Elisabeth Craft, Sarah Fain, Le Livre de Poche Jeunesse, 6 oct. 2010, (ill. Solène Debiès) 
 Le jour où j'ai voulu devenir populaire, Meg Cabot, Le Livre de Poche Jeunesse, 09 juin 2010, (Ill. Solène Debiès) 
 Les coups d'food de Farida, Farida, éditions du Chêne, 2 mai 2012, (ill. Solène Debiès) 
 Mini-kit de survie de la nana bio, Marie Beuzard, Isabelle Delannoy, éditions Eyrolles, 10 janv. 2013, (ill. Solène Debiès) 
 Down dog Billionaire, Lucy Edge (ill. Solène Debiès), 27 juil. 2015 
 Guide (très) pratique du parfait parisien, Olivier Giraud, French arrogance prod, (ill. Solène Debiès), 24 nov. 2018 
 So Nice !, Tomes 1 à 4, Carolyn Chouinard, Laura Boisvert, éditions dominique et compagnie (ill. Solène Debiès)  -  - 
 Journal d'une princesse, Tomes 1 à 11, Meg Cabot, éditions Hachette Roman, (ill. Solène Debiès)

 
 
 
 
 
 
 
 

 Anna et son fantôme, Tomes 1 et 2, Franck Krebs, (ill. Solène Debiès) 
 Miss Parfaite, Frédérique Dufort, éditions Boomerang, nov. 2018, (ill. Solène Debiès) 
 Un karma presque parfait, Roxane  Dambre, éditions Calmann-Lévy 
 Un appart de rêve, Roxane Dambre, éditions Calmann-Lévy, 2 mai 2019, (ill. Solène Debiès)

References

External links 

 Official website

1975 births
Living people
20th-century French women artists
21st-century French women artists
French illustrators
Graphic artists
Artists from Brest, France